Cardamine bulbifera, known as coralroot bittercress or coral root, is a species of flowering plant in the family Brassicaceae. It is found in damp places.

References

bulbifera
Plants described in 1769
Taxa named by Carl Linnaeus